Portland Street Blues (古惑仔情義篇之洪興十三妹) is a 1998 Hong Kong film, directed by Yip Wai Man. The film is a spin-off of the Young and Dangerous series of films.

Synopsis
This spin-off movie provides a contrast to the other Young and Dangerous films with greater character development. This time, the story's focus is on a female character - Sister 13 (Sandra Ng) of the "Hung Hing" triad. In a triad underworld dominated by men, the film tells the story of how she faces trials and tribulations of rising to become the branch leader of Portland Street. The story shows the reasons she became a lesbian. The film also gives more details about the "Tung Sing" triad, and how the relationship between Sister 13 and Ben Hon develops.

Notes
 Notable absences: Chicken, Dai Tin-Yee, Tai Fei and Chairman Chiang
 This is one of the few movies in which Ng Man Tat, who is usually in many mo lei tau movies, took a more serious role, making this movie an example of his ability to act in other kinds of role.
 Ng Man-Tat, Sandra Ng and John Ching were previously in a film together in the movie God of Gamblers III: Back to Shanghai, which starred Stephen Chow.
 In the same year, John Ching and Kristy Yang also appeared opposite each other in the ATV series My Date with a Vampire. Coincidentally like the movie, Ching's character also has an attraction to Yang's character. However, the movie depicted the attraction out of lust while the series depicted the attraction as innocent since Ching's character was depicted as a "mother's boy".

Cast and roles
 Sandra Ng Kwan Yue - Sister Thirteen/Tsui Siu Siu
 Kristy Yang - Cheung May Yun (as Kristy Yeung)
 Alex Fong Chung-Sun - Coke
 Wan Yeung-ming - Ben Hon (credited as Vincent Wan)
 Shu Qi - Scarface
 John Ching - S.O.B.
 Ekin Cheng - Chan Ho-Nam
 Jason Chu - Banana Skin
 Jerry Lamb - Pou-Pan
 Ng Man Tat - Tat
 Ken Lo - Prince	
 Matt Chow
 Kam Hing Ying	
 Kwan Hoi-Shan	
 Lee Siu-kei	
 Ng Chi Hung - Uncle Bee
 Francis Ng - Ugly Kwan
 Peter Ngor		
 Jimmy Wong Ga Lok		
 Bobby Yip		
 Henry Yue Young

Awards and nominations
18th Hong Kong Film Awards
 Won: Best Actress (Sandra Ng)
 Won: Best Supporting Actress (Shu Qi)
 Nominated: Best Supporting Actress (Kristy Yang)

35th Golden Horse Awards
 Won: Best Supporting Actress (Shu Qi)
 Nominated: Best Actress (Sandra Ng)

References

External links 
 

1998 films
Triad films
Hong Kong LGBT-related films
Lesbian-related films
Golden Harvest films
Films directed by Raymond Yip
Young and Dangerous
1998 LGBT-related films
1990s Hong Kong films